Carmichaelia muritai, common name coastal tree broom, is a species of plant in the family Fabaceae. It is found only in the South Island of New Zealand.

Distribution and habitat
It is found in coastal forest at Clifford Bay in Marlborough.

Taxonomy
It was first described in 1985 by Andrew Purdie as Chordospartium muritai. In 1998, Peter Heenan assigned it to the genus, Carmichaelia.

Conservation status
In 1998 it was declared "critically endangered" under IUCN2.3 (with just 12 plants existing in the wild),  and in 2018, it was declared "Nationally endangered" under the New Zealand Threat Classification System.

There are just two small natural populations known. One population is seriously threatened by goats,  drought, erosion and weeds, while the other is threatened by fire. Every part of C. muritai is highly sought by browsing animals (particularly, goats, possums, hares and rabbits).

References

Endangered flora of New Zealand
Critically endangered plants
muritai
Taxobox binomials not recognized by IUCN